Peeter Siegfried Nikolaus Põld (12 July 1878 Puru, Wierland County – 1 September 1930) was an Estonian pedagogic scientist, school director and politician (member of the Estonian People's Party), and the first Estonian Minister of Education. He was born in Puru, Kreis Wierland, Governorate of Estonia. As curator of the University of Tartu (1918–1925), he oversaw the university's transition to the Estonian language in the newly independent country.

References 

1878 births
1930 deaths
People from Jõhvi Parish
People from Kreis Wierland
Estonian People's Party politicians
Education ministers of Estonia
Members of the Estonian Provincial Assembly
Members of the Estonian Constituent Assembly
Members of the Riigikogu, 1920–1923
Members of the Riigikogu, 1926–1929
Members of the Riigikogu, 1929–1932
Estonian educators
20th-century Estonian educators
University of Tartu alumni
Academic staff of the University of Tartu